Hagen-Wehringhausen station is a through station in the city of Hagen in the German state of North Rhine-Westphalia. The station was opened on 27 May 1979 on a section of the Düsseldorf-Derendorf–Dortmund Süd railway, opened by the Rhenish Railway Company (RhE) between Wuppertal-Wichlinghausen and Hagen RhE station (now Hagen-Eckesey depot) on 15 September 1879. It has one platform track and it is classified by Deutsche Bahn as a category 6 station. The track bed in the station and the nearby bridge at the eastern end of the station are constructed to carry a second track. The only entrance to the station is a staircase which leads to Minervastraße.

The station is served by Rhine-Ruhr S-Bahn line S 8 between Mönchengladbach and Hagen and line S 9 between Recklinghausen and Hagen over Gladbeck, Bottrop, Essen, Velbert, Wuppertal , both every 60 minutes.

The station lies near the Akku-Hawker bus stop, where the 542 Hagener Straßenbahn bus service is calling.

Notes

S8 (Rhine-Ruhr S-Bahn)
Rhine-Ruhr S-Bahn stations
Buildings and structures in Hagen
Railway stations in Germany opened in 1979
S9 (Rhine-Ruhr S-Bahn)